In quantum electrodynamics, the vertex function describes the coupling between a photon and an electron beyond the leading order of perturbation theory.  In particular, it is the one particle irreducible correlation function involving the fermion , the antifermion , and the vector potential A.

Definition
The vertex function  can be defined in terms of a functional derivative of the effective action Seff as

The vertex function is constrained by the symmetries of quantum electrodynamics — Lorentz invariance; gauge invariance or the transversality of the photon, as expressed by the Ward identity; and invariance under parity — to take the following form:

where ,  is the incoming four-momentum of the external photon (on the right-hand side of the figure), and F1(q2) and F2(q2) are form factors that depend only on the momentum transfer q2.  At tree level (or leading order), F1(q2) = 1 and F2(q2) = 0.  Beyond leading order, the corrections to F1(0) are exactly canceled by the field strength renormalization.  The form factor F2(0) corresponds to the anomalous magnetic moment a of the fermion, defined in terms of the Landé g-factor as:

References

External links

Quantum electrodynamics
Quantum field theory